The inmates are running the asylum is:

 A reference to 1989 cult film Dr. Caligari.
 A reference to the 1920 film The Cabinet of Dr. Caligari.
 A reference to the 2014 film Stonehearst Asylum.
 A book by software designer and programmer Alan Cooper, "the father of Visual Basic".
 See also, the 1981 song by British band, Fun Boy Three, "The Lunatics Have Taken Over the Asylum".